Dubai Investments Park (DIP), including Dubai Investment Park – 1 (to the west) and  Dubai Investment Park – 2 (to the east), is a business park area in Dubai, United Arab Emirates, including commercial, and industrial, and residential development. The Green Community Village and Green Community East are to the north and Dunes Village is to the northeast. DIP was established in 1997.

Dubai Investments Park covers an area of 2,300 hectares. Greenfield International School, a private international school established in 2007, is located here.

The Dubai Investment Park metro station in the Green Community Village area is on the Route 2020 branch line of the Dubai Metro to the Expo 2020 site immediately to the south of Dubai Investment Park, across Expo Road (E77). To the west is the Jebel Ali Industrial Area, across the E311 road, and to the southwest is the Jebel Ali Free Zone Extension.

The development includes the Lagoons, under development by Schön Properties since 2005; Schön's assets were seized by the Dubai Real Estate Regulatory Agency in August 2018 over the company's failure to complete the development.

See also
 List of development projects in Dubai

References

External links
 Dubai Investments Park website

1997 establishments in the United Arab Emirates
Business parks of the United Arab Emirates
Economy of Dubai
Geography of Dubai